
Pitmatic (originally: "Pitmatical",  colloquially known as "Yakka") is a group of traditional Northern English dialects spoken in rural areas of the Northumberland and Durham Coalfield in England.

The separating dialectal development from other Northumbrian dialects, such as Geordie, is due to mineworkers' jargon used in local coal pits. In Tyneside and Northumberland, Cuddy is an abbreviation of the name Cuthbert but in Durham Pitmatic cuddy denotes a horse, specifically a pit pony. In Lowland Scots, cuddie usually refers to a donkey or ass but may also denote a short, thick, strong horse.

According to the British Library, "Locals insist there are significant differences between Geordie [spoken in Newcastle upon Tyne] and several other local dialects, such as Pitmatic and Mackem. Pitmatic is the dialect of the former mining areas in County Durham and around Ashington to the north of Newcastle upon Tyne, while Mackem is used locally to refer to the dialect of the city of Sunderland and the surrounding urban area of Wearside".

Traditionally the dialect as spoken in Northumberland, with rural Northumbrian communities including Rothbury, used the Northumbrian burr. This is now less frequently heard; since the closure of the area's deep mines, younger people speak in local ways that do not usually include this characteristic. The guttural r sound can, however, still sometimes be detected amongst elderly populations in rural areas. The variety spoken in Durham is non-rhotic but traditionally still subject to the Nurse-north merger in words like forst 'first' and bord 'bird', which came about as a result of burr modification.

Dialectology

While in theory Pitmatic was spoken throughout the Great Northern Coalfield, from Ashington in Northumberland to Fishburn in County Durham, early references apply specifically to its use by miners especially from the Durham district (1873)  and to its use in County Durham (1930). Pitmatic is not a homogenous entity varies between and within the two counties. Durham Pitmatic, particularly in East Durham, is grouped linguistically with Mackem under the 'Central Urban North-Eastern English' dialect region while Northumberland Pitmatic is grouped with Geordie as part of the 'Northern Urban North-Eastern English' area.

Dialect words in Northumberland and Tyneside, including many specific to the coal-mining industry, were collected in the two volumes of Northumberland Words by Oliver Heslop in 1892 and 1894. A dictionary of East Durham Pitmatic as spoken in Hetton-le-Hole was compiled by Palgrave in 1896. A dictionary,  including analysis of the origin of words was also complied in 2007 by Bill Griffiths.

Although he did not use the term Pitmatic, Alexander J. Ellis's work on the language of miners "between rivers Tyne and Wansbeck" has been studied as an early transcription of Pitmatic, which used informants from Earsdon and Backworth.  In the 1950s, the Survey of English Dialects included Earsdon as a site and many of the forms recorded matched the transcriptions in Ellis's early work, although some appeared to have modified under pressure from other forms of English.

Harold Orton compiled a database of dialect forms for 35 locations in Northumberland and northern Durham, known as the Orton Corpus.

In 1973, a book Pit Talk in County Durham was written by a local miner named David John Douglass, who later moved to South Yorkshire and published a series of socialist books.

In media

Melvyn Bragg presented a programme on BBC Radio 4 about pitmatic as part of a series on regional dialects.  Pitmatic has rarely featured in entertainment.  One of the few cases is the second episode of Ken Loach's series Days of Hope, which was filmed around Esh Winning in Durham with mostly local actors, although the lead Paul Copley has a Yorkshire accent.

See also Bobby Thompson (comedian).

Related forms of English
Other Northern English dialects include
 Cumbrian and Northumbrian dialects
 Geordie (spoken in Tyneside); see also Geordie dialect words
 Mackem (spoken in Wearside)
Smoggie (spoken in Teesside)
 Yorkshire and Lancashire dialects 
 Scouse (spoken in Merseyside)
Mancunian (Spoken in Manchester)

Notes

References
Dictionary of North-East Dialect, Bill Griffiths (Northumbria University Press, 2004).
Pitmatic: The Talk of the North East Coalfields, Bill Griffiths (Northumbria University Press, 2007).

External links
 Pitmatic word list
Durham Dialect website
Dialect Poems from the English regions
 Sounds Familiar? Listen to examples of regional accents and dialects from across the UK on the British Library's 'Sounds Familiar' website
 Guardian review of "Pitmatic: The Talk of the North East Coalfield"
 BBC News report on release of Griffiths' book
 YouTube video of a Pitmatic poem, as read by its author
 We're Not Mackems: A Pitmatic Dictionary
 'Jowl, Jowl and Listen' Film of North East miners talking about their work and lives: Faze3films

Northumberland
North East England
English language in England
Working-class culture in England
Coal mining in England